The  was a battle during the Sengoku period (16th century) of Japan.
Marune was a frontier fortress in the possession of Oda Nobunaga. 

Matsudaira Motoyasu, who was at the time a forced retainer of the Imagawa, captured the fortress as part of the Imagawa advance that led to the fateful Battle of Okehazama in 1560. Throughout Ieyasu's siege of this castle, he and his men were not present at the Battle of Okehazama where Imagawa Yoshimoto was killed in Nobunaga's surprise assault. He made good use of concentrated arquebus fire. During the siege, Sakuma Morishige the commander of the fortress, was killed by a bullet.

References

1560 in Japan
Marune
Marune 1560
Conflicts in 1560